Lost Lake Woods is an unincorporated community and census-designated place (CDP) in Alcona County in the U.S. state of Michigan.  The population was 367 at the 2020 census.  It is located within Alcona Township.

Entry into the community is strictly for members and guests only. It is located just north of the village of Lincoln.

Geography

Major highways
 is a county-designated highway that forms the eastern boundary of the CDP.

Demographics

As of the census of 2020, there were 367  people, 191  households, and 127 families residing in the CDP. The racial makeup of the CDP was 99.41% White, 0.29% Native American, and 0.29% from two or more races. Hispanic or Latino of any race were 0.29% of the population.

There were 189 households, out of which 5.3% had children under the age of 18 living with them, 64.6% were married couples living together, 1.6% had a female householder with no husband present, and 32.3% were non-families. 31.2% of all households were made up of individuals, and 23.8% had someone living alone who was 65 years of age or older.  The average household size was 1.79 and the average family size was 2.14.

In the CDP, the population was spread out, with 4.7% under the age of 18, 0.6% from 18 to 24, 8.3% from 25 to 44, 31.6% from 45 to 64, and 54.9% who were 65 years of age or older.  The median age was 67 years. For every 100 females, there were 101.8 males.  For every 100 females age 18 and over, there were 97.0 males.

The median income for a household in the CDP was $32,361, and the median income for a family was $40,714. Males had a median income of $21,875 versus $19,688 for females. The per capita income for the CDP was $22,546.  About 1.5% of families and 3.8% of the population were below the poverty line, including none of those under age 18 and 3.6% of those age 65 or over.

Education
Lost Lake Woods is served entirely by Alcona Community Schools.

References

Unincorporated communities in Alcona County, Michigan
Census-designated places in Michigan
Unincorporated communities in Michigan
Census-designated places in Alcona County, Michigan
Populated places established in 1926
1926 establishments in Michigan